The 3rd North African Infantry Division was a French Army formation during World War II.

History 
During the Battle of France in May 1940 the division was made up of the following units:

12th Zouaves Regiment
14th Algerian Tirailleurs Regiment
15th Algerian Tirailleurs Regiment
93rd Reconnaissance Battalion
20th Colonial Artillery Regiments
220th Colonial Artillery Regiment.

It was an active division which existed between 1936 and 1940. The Tirailleurs Regiments were made up of native troops from Algeria.  The Zouaves Regiment was made up from European settlers in North Africa and some recruited from France.

Commanders 
 1936 - 1939 : General Théodore Marcel Sciard
 1939 : General Pierre François Joseph Tarrit
 1939 : General Édouard Charles François Chapouilly
 1940 : General Charles Mast

References 

North African Infantry Division, 3rd
Infantry divisions of France